John Read is a psychologist and mental health researcher from England. He is Professor of Clinical Psychology in the University of East London's School of Psychology.

Read was formerly a clinical psychologist in the Department of Psychology at the University of Auckland. His research interests include: attitudes towards 'mental illness', psycho-social causes of psychosis, and the role of the pharmaceutical industry in psychology.

Before joining the university in 1994, Read worked for twenty years as a manager of mental health services, working with people experiencing psychosis. He is the Editor of the journal Psychosis and is on the editorial boards of two other journals. He is also on the executive board of the International Society for the Psychological Treatments of Schizophrenia. Read is the editor of Models of Madness: Psychological, Social and Biological Approaches to Schizophrenia (Routledge, 2004) which has sold over 10,000 copies and been translated into Chinese, Russian, Spanish and Swedish.  In 2010 he received the New Zealand Psychological Society's Sir Thomas Hunter Award for ‘excellence in scholarship, research and professional achievement’.

In 2010, Read and Richard Bentall co-authored a literature review on "The effectiveness of electroconvulsive therapy" (ECT). It examined placebo-controlled studies and concluded ECT had minimal benefits for people with depression and schizophrenia. The authors said "given the strong evidence of persistent and, for some, permanent brain dysfunction, primarily evidenced in the form of retrograde and anterograde amnesia, and the evidence of a slight but significant increased risk of death, the cost-benefit analysis for ECT is so poor that its use cannot be scientifically justified". Psychiatrists, however, sharply criticized this paper in passing by calling it an "evidence-poor paper with an anti-ECT agenda".

Selected publications
 
 
 

 
 
 
 
 
 
 The effectiveness of electroconvulsive therapy: a literature review.

See also
 Richard Bentall
 Hearing Voices Network
 Index of psychology articles
 Loren Mosher
 Outline of psychology
 Psychosis (journal)
 Jim van Os

References

External links 
 Staff profile at the University of East London

Living people
New Zealand psychologists
Psychosis
Schizophrenia researchers
Schizophrenia
Academic staff of the University of Auckland
Academics of the University of East London
Year of birth missing (living people)